Rang Frah Government College, Changlang, established in 1996, is a private general degree college in Changlang, Arunachal Pradesh. It offers undergraduate courses in science, arts and commerce. It is affiliated to  Rajiv Gandhi University.

Accreditation
The college is recognized by the University Grants Commission (UGC).

References

External links

Colleges affiliated to Rajiv Gandhi University
Educational institutions established in 1996
Universities and colleges in Arunachal Pradesh
1996 establishments in Arunachal Pradesh